"Bones" was the fifth and final single from An End Has a Start, the second album by Editors. It was only released in Continental Europe under the PIAS label as a download only single. It was released to help promote the band during the festival run and their support of R.E.M. in July during their German shows. "Bones" was one of the first songs off An End Has A Start to be performed live, along with "The Weight Of The World" in 2006. It has since gone through many changes, most notably the bridge and outro of the song which was previewed via a short video made by the band months before the album came out.

Video
The video includes on stage and behind the scenes footage shot during the European tour in March and April 2008. It was directed by the band's bassist Russell Leetch.

Track listing
Digital download:
 "Bones" – 4:06

References

2007 songs
2008 singles
Editors (band) songs
Song recordings produced by Jacknife Lee
PIAS Recordings singles
Songs written by Edward Lay
Songs written by Russell Leetch
Songs written by Tom Smith (musician)
Songs written by Chris Urbanowicz